The 1975 South Australian state election was held on 12 July 1975.

Since the previous election, the Liberal and Country League had formally become the South Australian branch of the Liberal Party. However, the breakaway Liberal Movement also contested the election with several sitting members. Seats won by the LCL in 1973 are listed below as Liberal-held, except for Goyder which had been won by the LM at a by-election.

Retiring Members

Labor
Ernie Crimes MHA (Spence)
Len King MHA (Coles)
Dave McKee MHA (Pirie)
John Ryan MHA (Price)
Alfred Kneebone MLC
Bert Shard MLC

Liberal
William McAnaney MHA (Heysen)
Sir Lyell McEwin MLC
Sir Arthur Rymill MLC
Victor Springett MLC

House of Assembly
Sitting members are shown in bold text. Successful candidates are highlighted in the relevant colour. Where there is possible confusion, an asterisk (*) is also used.

Legislative Council
Sitting members are shown in bold text. Tickets that elected at least one MLC are highlighted in the relevant colour. Successful candidates are identified by an asterisk (*). Eleven seats were up for election. This was the first time the Legislative Council had been elected as a whole state by proportional representation; two Labor and seven Liberal MLCs up for re-election, as well as an LM member.

References

Candidates for South Australian state elections
1975 elections in Australia
1970s in South Australia